AMD's Socket FT3 or BGA-769 targets mobile devices and was designed for APUs codenamed Kabini and Temash, Beema and Mullins (Socket FT3b).

"Kabini"- and "Temash"-branded products combine Jaguar with Islands (GCN), UVD 3 and VCE 2.0 video acceleration and AMD Eyefinity-based multi-monitor support of maximum two monitors.

"Beema"- and "Mullins"-branded products combine Puma with AMD Radeon Rx 200 Series (GCN), UVD 3 and VCE 2.0 video acceleration and AMD Eyefinity-based multi-monitor support of maximum two monitors.

Its desktop counterpart is Socket AM1.

Feature overview for AMD APUs

See also
 List of AMD processors with 3D graphics

External links

 Socket FS1 Design Specification

AMD mobile sockets